Roeslerstammia erxlebella is a moth of the family Yponomeutidae. It is found in all of Europe (except Ireland, the Iberian Peninsula and the Balkan Peninsula), east to Japan.

The wingspan is about 13 mm. There are two generations with adults on the wing in May and June and again in August and September.

The larvae feed on small-leaved lime (Tilia cordata), common lime (Tilia × europaea), sycamore (Acer pseudoplatanus) and sometimes birch (Betula species). They mine the leaves of their host plant. The mine consists of a short, irregular, full depth corridor, which is always located at the leaf margin and generally in the tip of the leaf. The frass is broadly scattered. The older larva lives free on the leaf.

Subspecies
 Roeslerstammia erxlebella bella Moriuti, 1982 (Japan)
 Roeslerstammia erxlebella erxlebella (Fabricius, 1787)

External links
 UKmoths
bladmineerders.nl 
Roeslerstammia erxlebella bella at Japanese Moths

Yponomeutidae
Leaf miners
Moths described in 1787
Moths of Asia
Moths of Europe
Taxa named by Johan Christian Fabricius